DWGC-TV (channel 8) is a television station in Daet, Camarines Norte, Philippines, airing programming from the GMA network. Owned and operated by the network's namesake corporate parent, the station maintains transmitter facilities at Purok 2, Barangay Mangcruz, Daet, Camarines Norte.

Although identifying as a separate station in its own right, DWGC-TV is considered a straight simulcast of DWAI-TV (channel 7) in Naga City.

GMA TV-8 Daet Programs
 Balitang Bicolandia - flagship afternoon newscast (simulcast on TV-7 Naga)
 Mornings with GMA Regional TV - flagship morning newscast (simulcast from GMA Dagupan)

References

See also
 List of GMA Network Stations

Television stations in Camarines Norte
GMA Network stations
Television channels and stations established in 2014